Ryan Wuest (born 27 February 1981 in Cape Town, Western Cape) is a South African association football player who last played as a goalkeeper for Bloemfontein Celtic in the Premier Soccer League. He also holds a Swiss passport.

Joined Celtic: 2009
Previous clubs: Bloemfontein Celtic, Kaizer Chiefs, APEP Kyperounda, Santos, Manning Rangers

References

1981 births
Living people
South African soccer players
Swiss men's footballers
Association football goalkeepers
Cypriot First Division players
Kaizer Chiefs F.C. players
APEP FC players
Sportspeople from Cape Town
South African expatriate soccer players
Expatriate footballers in Cyprus
Bloemfontein Celtic F.C. players
White South African people
Santos F.C. (South Africa) players
Manning Rangers F.C. players